The 2017 Indonesia Super Series Premier was the fifth Super Series tournament of the 2017 BWF Super Series. The tournament took place in Jakarta, Indonesia from 12–18 June 2017 with a total purse of $1,000,000.

Venue 
This tournament was held at the  Jakarta Convention Center Plenary Hall because the Istora Gelora Bung Karno was being renovated for the 2018 Asian Games.

Men's singles

Seeds

Top half

Bottom half

Finals

Women's singles

Seeds

Top half

Bottom half

Finals

Men's doubles

Seeds

Top half

Bottom half

Finals

Women's doubles

Seeds

Top half

Bottom half

Finals

Mixed doubles

Seeds

Top half

Bottom half

Finals

References

External links
 Tournament Link

Indonesia Open (badminton)
Indonesia Super Series Premier
Sport in Indonesia
2017 in Indonesian sport
June 2017 sports events in Asia